Captain George Purvis (27 July 1680 – 8 March 1741), of Darsham, Suffolk,  was a Royal Navy officer and Whig politician who sat in the House of Commons from 1732 to 1741.

Purvis was the eldest son of George Purvis of Darsham and his wife Margaret Berry daughter of George Dakins, and widow of a brother of Admiral Sir John Berry. He joined the Royal Navy and was a Captain in 1709, serving under Sir Charles Wager in the West Indies and at Gibraltar. He married Elizabeth Allen of Yoxford, Suffolk on 3 February 1712. In 1715,  he succeeded his father to Darsham.
 
Purvis  was the protégé of Wager and was returned unopposed as Whig Member of Parliament for Aldeburgh at a by-election on 21 January 1732. He was returned unopposed there again at the 1734 British general election. In 1735 he was appointed Commissioner of the Navy. In Parliament he looked after the Admiralty interest and voted with the Government on all known occasions.

Purvis  died at Islington on 8 March 1741, leaving three sons and a daughter:
Charles Wager Purvis.- his heir named after Sir Charles Wager   
George Purvis  - father of John Child Purvis.
Harvey Purvis 
Martha Purvis who married Thomas Pearse

References

1680 births
1741 deaths
Royal Navy officers
Members of the Parliament of Great Britain for English constituencies
British MPs 1727–1734
British MPs 1734–1741